Allred is an unincorporated community in Yoakum County, in the U.S. state of Texas.

History
Allred was laid out in 1938, and named for James V. Allred, 33rd Governor of Texas. A post office was established at Allred in 1938, and remained in operation until 1957.

References

Unincorporated communities in Yoakum County, Texas
Unincorporated communities in Texas